Depleted zinc oxide (DZO) is a zinc oxide depleted in the zinc isotope with the atomic mass 64, and used as a corrosion inhibitor in nuclear pressurized water reactors.

The depletion of 64Zn is necessary, because this isotope is transformed into 65Zn by neutron capture. 65Zn with a half-life of 244.26 days emits gamma radiation with 1.115 MeV.   64Zn has a natural abundance of 48.6%, but in DZO it is reduced below 1%. Adding zinc oxide to the primary water loop of a boiling water reactor or pressurized water nuclear reactor reduces corrosion and therefore minimizes the amount of dissolved materials, especially 60Co.

The isotope separation of zinc is done by gas centrifugation of diethylzinc.

References

External links

Nuclear materials
Corrosion inhibitors
Zinc oxide
Isotopes of zinc